Moscow is an unincorporated community in Jefferson County, Arkansas, United States. Moscow has a post office with ZIP code 71659.

Education
Moscow is in the Pine Bluff School District. It operates Pine Bluff High School.

Moscow was formerly in the Linwood School District. On July 1, 1984, the Linwood School District consolidated into the Pine Bluff school district.

 for pre-kindergarten all PBSD areas are now assigned to Forrest Park/Greenville School.

References

Unincorporated communities in Jefferson County, Arkansas
Unincorporated communities in Arkansas